Boven-Digoel may refer to:

 Boven Digoel Regency
 Boven-Digoel concentration camp